Ajmer  is one of the major and oldest cities in the Indian state of Rajasthan and the centre of the eponymous Ajmer District. It is located at the centre of Rajasthan.  It is also known as heart of Rajasthan. The city was established as "Ajayameru" (translated as "Invincible Hills") by a Chahamana ruler, either Ajayaraja I or Ajayaraja II, and served as their capital until the 12th century CE.

Ajmer is surrounded by the Aravalli Mountains. Ajmer has been a municipality since 1869. Ajmer has been selected as one of the heritage cities for the HRIDAY and Smart City Mission schemes of the Government of India.

History 

Ajmer was originally known as Ajayameru. The city was founded by an 11th-century Chahamana king Ajaydeva. Historian Dasharatha Sharma notes that the earliest mention of the city's name occurs in Palha's Pattavali, which was copied in 1113 CE (1170 VS) at Dhara. This suggests that Ajmer was founded sometime before 1113 CE. A prashasti (eulogistic inscription), issued by Vigraharaja IV and found at Adhai Din Ka Jhonpra (Sanskrit college), states Ajayadeva (that is Ajayaraja II) moved his residence to Ajmer.

A later text Prabandha-Kosha states that it was the 8th-century king Ajayaraja I who commissioned the Ajayameru fort, which later came to be known as the Taragarh fort of Ajmer. According to historian R. B. Singh, this claim appears to be true, as inscriptions dated to the 8th century CE have been found at Ajmer. Singh theorizes that Ajayaraja II later expanded the town area, constructed palaces, and moved the Chahamana capital from Shakambhari to Ajmer.

In 1193, Ajmer was annexed by the Ghurids and later was returned to Rajput rulers under condition of tribute.

In 1556, Ajmer came under the Mughal Empire after being conquered by Mughal Emperor Akbar. It was made the capital of the eponymous Ajmer Subah. The city enjoyed special favour under the Mughals, who made frequent pilgrimages to the city to visit the dargah of Moinuddin Chishti. The city was also used as a military base for campaigns against Rajput rulers, and on a number of occasions became the site of celebration when a campaign bore success. Mughal Emperors and their nobles made generous donations to the city, and endowed it with constructions such as Akbar's palace and pavilions along the Ana Sagar. Their most prominent building activities were in the dargah and its vicinity. Jahanara Begum and Dara Shikoh, children of Shah Jahan, were both born in the city in 1614 and 1615 respectively.

Mughal patronage of the city had waned by the beginning of the 18th century. In 1771, the Scindias conquered the city, and in 1818, the British gained authority over the city. A municipality was established at Ajmer in 1866. Colonial-era Ajmer served as the headquarters of the Ajmer-Merwara Province and possessed a Central jail, a large General Hospital, and two smaller hospitals according to Gazetteer, 1908. It was the headquarters of a native regiment and of a Railway Volunteer corps. From the 1900s, the United Free Church of Scotland, the church of England, the Roman Catholics, and the American Episcopal Methodists have mission establishments here. At that time there were twelve printing presses in the city, from which eight weekly newspapers were published.

At the time of India's independence in 1947, Ajmer continued as a separate state with its own legislature until its merger with erstwhile Rajputana province then called Rajasthan. The Legislature of Ajmer State was housed in the building which now houses T. T. College. It had 30 MLAs, and Haribhau Upadhyay was the first chief minister of the erstwhile state, with Bhagirath Chaudhary as the first Vidhan Sabha speaker. In 1956, after acceptance of the proposal by Fazil Ali, Ajmer was merged into Rajasthan to form Ajmer District with the addition of Kishangarh sub-division of Jaipur district.url=https://www.google.com/books/edition/A_History_of_Rajasthan/tosMAQAAMAAJ |page=1166}}</ref> Colonial-era Ajmer served as the headquarters of the Ajmer-Merwara Province and possessed a Central jail, a large General Hospital, and two smaller hospitals according to Gazetteer, 1908. It was the headquarters of a native regiment and of a Railway Volunteer corps. From the 1900s, the United Free Church of Scotland, the church of England, the Roman Catholics, and the American Episcopal Methodists have mission establishments here. At that time there were twelve printing presses in the city, from which eight weekly newspapers were published.

Other Names
A Gujarati historic Novel named Gujaratno Jay written by Zaverchand Meghani, based on various Jain Prabandhas, describes the city as sapādalakṣaṇa (સપાદલક્ષણ).

Geography
Ajmer is in the northwest of India and is surrounded by the Aravali Mountains. It is situated on the lower slopes of the Taragarh Hill of that range. To the northwest is the Nagapathar Range of the Aravali Mountain Ranges which protects it from desertification from the Thar Desert.

Climate
During the monsoon there is frequent heavy rain and thunderstorms, but flooding is not a common occurrence. There are, however, occasional cold weather fronts that cause temperatures to fall to near freezing levels.

Transportation

Air
The Kishangarh Airport is the nearest airport. It is 25 km from Ajmer city. The Ajmer Airport ground breaking ceremony was done by then Prime Minister of India Dr. Manmohan Singh in 2012. The airport was finally completed and inaugurated by then Union Minister of State for Civil Aviation Jayant Sinha and Chief Minister Vasundhara Raje on 11 October 2017. The Airport is operational since then and regular flights to/from Delhi, Mumbai, Hyderabad, Ahmedabad, Indore and Surat are currently available. The airport is now amongst main and busy airports of Rajasthan. Currently SpiceJet and Star Air operate from Ajmer Airport on daily basis. Kishangarh Airport, Ajmer is being managed and operated  by Airport Authority of India (AAI).

The Jaipur International Airport which is 135 km from Ajmer is the nearest International Airport.

Rail
The Ajmer Junction is the main railway station situated in the city. and was built during colonial times.

Tourism 

Pushkar:  Located few kilometres from Ajmer, is an important tourist and pilgrimage destination and a satellite town of Ajmer city. It is famous for Pushkar Lake and the 14th century Brahma Temple at Pushkar, dedicated to Brahmā, according to the Padma Purāņa, Pushkar is important pilgrimage site for Lord Brahmā. Around the world, Lord Brahma Temple is only situated at Pushkar Lake, Rajasthan, India.
Taragarh Fort: It is reputed to be the oldest hill fort in India. This hill fort guarding Ajmer, was the seat of the Chauhan rulers. It was built by King Ajaypal Chauhan on the summit of Taragarh Hill and overlooks Ajmer. The battlements run along the top of the hill. When it fell to the British Raj, the fort was dismantled on the orders of Lord William Bentinck in 1832 and was converted into a sanatorium for the British troops stationed at the garrison town of Nasirabad. Within it stands the shrine of a Muhammadan saint, Saiyid Husain, known as the Ganj Shahldan.In the older city, lying in the valley beneath the Taragarh hill and now abandoned, the Nur-chashma, a garden-house used by the Mughals, still remains, as also a water-lift commenced by Maldeo Rathor, to raise water to the Taragarh citadel.
Ajmer Sharif Dargah: It is a shrine of Khwaja Moinuddin Chishti which is situated at the foot of the Taragarh hill, and consists of several white marble buildings arranged around two courtyards, including a massive gate donated by the Nizam of Hyderabad, and the Akbari Mosque, built by the Mughal emperor Shah Jahan and containing the domed tomb of the saint. Akbar and his queen used to come here by foot every year on pilgrimage from Agra in observance of a vow when he prayed for a son. The large pillars called "Kose ('Mile') Minars" (Kos Minar), erected at intervals of about  along the entire way between Agra and Ajmer mark the places where the royal pilgrims halted every day, they are also seen today, one such is near private bus station in Ajmer City. About 125,000 pilgrims visit the site every day. The Urs of Khwaja Moinuddin Chishti is celebrated every year on the 6th and 7th of Rajab.
Adhai Din Ka Jhonpra: Literally meaning "shed of two-and-a-half days", it is an ASI protected monument near Ajmer Sharif Dargah and a converted mosque built after the partial destruction of earlier Hindu and Jain temples there on orders of Muhammad Ghori after he defeated Prithviraj Chauhan at  the second battle of Tarain.
Mayo College: The college was founded in 1875 at the suggestion of Lord Mayo as a college where the sons of chiefs and nobles might receive an education to fit them for their high positions and important duties. It was known as "Indian Eton", as a number of Indian princes studied in this college. The main building, in white marble, is a classic example of Indo-Saracenic architecture. In front of the college is memorial marble statue of Lord Mayo.  The boarding-houses are arranged in the form of a horseshoe, with the college in the centre of the base. Some of the Native States built boarding-houses, while the Government of India presented the college park, comprising 167 acres and formerly the site of the old Residency, and erected the main building, the residences of the principal and vice-principal, and the Ajmer boarding- house. It provided the salaries of the English staff. The foundation-stone of the college was laid in 1878, and the building was opened by the Marquis of Dufferin in 1885. John Lockwood Kipling, father of Nobel Laureate, Rudyard Kipling, had been principal of Mayo College.
Soni Ji Ki Nasiyaan: It is architecturally rich Jain temple built in the late nineteenth century whose main chamber Swarna Nagari "City of Gold", has prominent depiction of Ayodhya made from 1000 kg of gold.
Akbari Fort & Museum: The city's museum was once the residence of Prince Salīm, the son of the Emperor Akbar, and presently houses a collection of Mughal and Rajput armour and sculpture. This is a magnificent example of Mughal architecture, construction of which was commissioned by Akbar in 1570. This is where Salim, as the Emperor Jahangir, read out the firman permitting the British East India Company to trade with India. It is a massive square building, with lofty octagonal bastions at each corner. It was the headquarters of the administration in their time and in that of the Marathas. It was here that the emperors appeared in state, and that, as recorded by Sir Thomas Roe, criminals were publicly executed. The interior was used as a magazine during the British occupation until 1857; and the central building, used as a tahsil office. With the fort, the outer city walls, of the same period, are connected. These surround the city and are pierced by the Delhi, Madar, Usri, Agra, and Tirpolia gates.
Nareli Jain Temple: is a Jain temple complex of fourteen temples recently built. It is known for its architecture and intricate stone carvings which gives it both a traditional and contemporary look.
Ana Sagar Lake: This is an historic man-made lake built by Maharaja Anaji (1135–1150 CE). By the lake is the Daulat Bagh, a garden laid out by Emperor Jahangir. Emperor Shah Jahan later added five pavilions, known as the Baradari, between the garden and the lake embankment of the Ana Sagar supports the beautiful marble pavilions erected as pleasure-houses by Shah Jahan. The embankment, moreover, contains the - site of the former hammam (bath-room). Three of the five pavilions were at one time formed into residences for British officials, while the embankment was covered with office buildings and enclosed by gardens. The houses and enclosures were finally removed in 1900–1902, when the two south pavilions were re-erected, the marble parapet completed, and the embankment restored, as far as practicable, to its early condition.The Baradari has since been closed for the public because of increased crowd and pollution caused by people.A new garden called Subhash Udhyan has been opened in the recent years in place of Baradari.
Lake Foy Sagar: It is a picturesque artificial lake that was created as a famine relief project in 1892 some 3 miles to the west of the city. It offers excellent views of Aravali mountains range as well migrating birds. The city used to derive its water-supply from it during colonial times. The water was conveyed into the city and suburbs through pipes which were laid underground. The capacity of the lake is 150,000,000 cubic feet.
Prithviraj Smark: Prithviraj Smark is dedicated to Prithviraj Chauhan. It is located on the way to Taragarh Fort. This place has a life-size statue of King Prithviraj Chauhan mounted on a horse.
Tomb of Khwaja Husain Ajmeri: Khwaja Husain Ajmeri also known as Shaikh Husain Ajmeri, he was a Grandson of Khwaja Moinuddin Chishty of Ajmer from the line of Khwaja Fakhruddin's son Khwaja Husamuddin Jigar Sokhta, he was SajjadaNasheen and Mutwalli of Ajmer Dargah before and during the time of Emperor Akbar and Emperor Jahangir, his tomb is situated near the Sola Khamba (Tomb of Khwaja Alauddin another grandson of Khwaja Moinuddin Chishty of Ajmer), Behind Shahjahani Mosque Dargar Sharif Ajmer, he died sometime between the year 1619 and 1620. his tomb was built in the year 1637–38.
Manibandh : Also known as Chamunda Mata Mandir is one among the 108 Shakti Pitha at Gayatri hills near Pushkar, 11 km from Ajmer. It takes 14 minutes to travel from Pushkar Lake to Chamunda Mata Mandir (about 5–6 km)

Education 
The city has many schools and colleges. Among them, Mayo College is a prominent college. The regional office of CBSE is located here.

Demographics

According to the 2011 census, Ajmer had a population of 542,321 in the city, 551,101 including its suburbs.

The female to male ratio in the city was 947/1,000. The literacy rate in the city was 86.52%, male literacy being 92.08% and female literacy being 80.69%.

Ajmer's population growth in the decade was 18.48%; this compares to a growth figure of 20.93% in the previous decade.

Villages
Ajaysar Village, Rajasthan, located in Srinagar block of Ajmer district
Ashok Nagar Ajmer (1989), colony

See also
Delhi Gate, Ajmer
Ajmeri Gate
Ajmeri Gate metro station
Qabil Ajmeri
Ajmeri Kalakand
Marwari language, also known as Ajmeri, spoken around Marwar and Ajmer

References

Bibliography 
 
 
 
 W.D. Begg: The Holy Biography of Hazrat Khwaja Muinuddin Chishti (Millat Book Centre, Delhi, 1999).
 Ajmer The Imperial Gazetteer of India, 1909, v. 5, p. 137-146.

External links
Ajmer District website
R. Nath Mughal Architecture Image Collection, Images from Ajmer - University of Washington Digital Collection

 
Cities and towns in Ajmer district
Holy cities
Tourist attractions in Rajasthan
1818 in British India